The moorland francolin (Scleroptila psilolaema) is a species of bird in the family Phasianidae. It is endemic to Ethiopia.

Distribution
It is found in moorland in the highlands of Ethiopia.

Taxonomy
The Elgon francolin of the highlands of Kenya and Uganda was formerly considered a subspecies of S. psilolaema, but was split as a distinct species by the IUCN Red List and BirdLife International in 2014, and by the International Ornithological Congress in 2022 based on a 2019 study. Compared to the moorland francolin, the Elgon francolin is brighter (more rufescent) and lacks black spots to the throat, and also differs in vocalizations.

References

moorland francolin
Endemic birds of Ethiopia
moorland francolin
moorland francolin
Taxonomy articles created by Polbot